John Galvin may refer to:

 John Galvin (Irish politician) (1907–1963), Irish Fianna Fáil politician 
 John Galvin (general) (1929–2015), American general
 John Galvin (baseball) (1842–1904), baseball player for the Brooklyn Atlantics
 John Galvin (American football) (born 1965), retired American football linebacker
 John Galvin (Gaelic footballer) (born 1980), Gaelic footballer from County Limerick
 John Galvin (hurler) (born 1953), Irish retired hurler